Laon is a railway station serving the town Laon., Aisne department, northern France. It was built in 1857 by Chemins de Fer du Nord. The station is served by regional trains to Paris, Amiens, Aulnoye-Aymeries and Reims.

History 
Chemins de Fer du Nord operates the station at the opening of the line section in Laon on September 1, 1853. It opens the section of Villers-Cotterets in Laon on June 2, 1862.

In 2016, according to SNCF estimates, the station's annual attendance is 777,328 passengers, after 805,082 travelers in 2015 and 842,067 travelers in 2014

A parking for vehicles is arranged around the station.

References 

Railway stations in Aisne
Railway stations in France opened in 1853